Vans is a shoe and apparel company.

Vans may also refer to:

Places
 Les Vans, a commune in the Ardèche department, France
 Vans Corner, Idaho
 Vans Valley (disambiguation)

Other
 The plural of van, a type of road vehicle
 Vans (name), both a given and surname
 "Vans", a 2006 song by The Pack from their album Skateboards 2 Scrapers
 Van's Aircraft, Oregon-based home built aircraft company

See also

 Vons, an American supermarket chain
 
 Van (disambiguation)
 Vannes (disambiguation)